Alvin Bernard Aubert (March 1930 – January 7, 2014) was a professor of English, poet, playwright, editor, literary critic, and scholar who championed African-American culture and rural life along the southern Mississippi River. He grew up in Lutcher, Louisiana, and attended Southern University, the University of Michigan, and the University of Illinois. He taught at Southern University, SUNY Fredonia,University of Oregon, and Wayne State University. At WSU he was a professor of English, taught creative writing and Afro-American literature, while serving as Interim Chair of the Department of Africana Studies. He founded and edited the award winning journal Obsidian, now Obsidian II, for publishing works in English by, and about, writes of African descent worldwide. He was a Woodrow Wilson Fellow in literature (1955), and a Bread Loaf Scholar in poetry (1968). His poems, articles, and reviews have appeared in literary magazines and anthologies, including regular reviews of Afro-American poetry books in Cornell University's "Epoch" magazine. His play, "Home From Harlem," was staged at WSU's Bonstelle Theatre in 1986, and in 1991 he completed his play, "Piney Brown." He served as an advisory editor to literary magazines and served on grants panels for New York's Creative Artist Public Service Program (CAPS), the National Endowment for the Arts, the Coordinating Council for Literary Magazines (CCLM), the Kentucky Arts Council, and the Detroit City Arts Council. He was a member of the College Language Association, the Black Theatre Network, and the Langston Hughes Society. 

He died on January 7, 2014, in Trenton, New Jersey. An extensive collection of his personal correspondence, journals, manuscripts, awards, and publications is housed at the Xavier University of Louisiana, Archives & Special Collections.

Honors
Aubert's many honors included two Creative Writing Fellowship Grants from the National Endowment for the Arts (1973, 1981), an Editors Fellowship Grant (1979) from the Coordinating Council of Literary Magazines for small press editing and publishing, the 1988 Callaloo Award for his contribution to Afro-American cultural expression, and the Xavier Activist for the Humanities Award.

Works
 Against the Blues (1972)
 Feeling Through (1975)
 A Noisesome Music (1979)
 South Louisiana: New and Selected Poems (1985)
 If Winter Come: Collected Poems 1967–1992 (1994)
 Harlem Wrestler and Other Poems (1995)

References

1930 births
2014 deaths
20th-century American poets
People from Lutcher, Louisiana
Poets from Louisiana
Southern University alumni
Southern University faculty
State University of New York at Fredonia faculty
University of Michigan alumni
Wayne State University faculty